Michael Kurtiz Baldo Williams (born October 27, 1991) is a Filipino-American professional basketball player for the TNT Tropang Giga of the Philippine Basketball Association (PBA).

Collegiate career
In his senior year at Cal State Fullerton, he scored a collegiate high of 29 points to go along with 6 rebounds in a losing effort to UCSB Gauchos.

Professional career
After he became undrafted in 2014 NBA draft, Williams played for Sioux Falls Skyforce in NBA G League from 2014 to 2016, and in Canton Charge from 2016 to 2017.

He also played as a heritage import for Saigon Heat in ASEAN Basketball League from 2017 to 2018. He then played for the GenSan Warriors of Maharlika Pilipinas Basketball League from 2018 to 2019, wherein he averaged 15.9 points, 6.6 assists, 5.1 rebounds, and 1.1 steals per game.

Williams made a PBA finals record of 10 three-pointers in a 98–106 loss of TNT Tropang Giga to the Magnolia Hotshots in Game 3 of the 2021 PBA Philippine Cup Finals.

PBA career statistics

As of the end of 2021 season

Season-by-season averages

|-
| align=left | 
| align=left | TNT
| 36 || 36.3 || .410 || .376 || .730 || 4.4 || 4.4 || .9 || .1 || 19.5
|- class="sortbottom"
| style="text-align:center;" colspan="2"|Career
| 36 || 36.3 || .410 || .376 || .730 || 4.4 || 4.4 || .9 || .1 || 19.5

Notes

References

External links
PBA.ph profile
NBA G League profile
Cal State Fullerton Titans bio
San Francisco Dons bio

1991 births
Living people
21st-century African-American sportspeople
African-American basketball players
American men's basketball players
American sportspeople of Filipino descent
Basketball players from Los Angeles
Cal State Fullerton Titans men's basketball players
Canton Charge players
Citizens of the Philippines through descent
Filipino men's basketball players
Maharlika Pilipinas Basketball League players
Philippine Basketball Association All-Stars
Point guards
Saigon Heat players
San Francisco Dons men's basketball players
Shooting guards
Sioux Falls Skyforce players
TNT Tropang Giga draft picks
TNT Tropang Giga players